Kim Byung-chul is the name of:

 Kim Byong-cheol, South Korean taekwondo practitioner
 Byung Chul Kim (born 1974), South Korean artist
 Kim Byung-chul (actor) (born 1974), South Korean actor
 Kim Byung-chul (businessman) (born 1938), South Korean businessman